Edison is a census-designated place (CDP) in Skagit County, Washington, United States. The population was 133 at the 2010 census. It is included in the Mount Vernon–Anacortes, Washington Metropolitan Statistical Area.

History
First settled in 1869 by Ben Samson, it was later named for inventor Thomas Edison.

In 1897 Edison became the headquarters of a national utopian socialist project known as Equality Colony, backed by an organization known as the Brotherhood of the Cooperative Commonwealth. The socialist colony was established on 280 acres just outside Edison and it engaged in farming and timber milling and included a school as well as blacksmith and copper-working shops. The Edison-based Brotherhood also published a newspaper called Industrial Freedom for national circulation to its approximately 3,000 supporters. The socialist community folded shortly after 1903, by which time only about 100 colony members remained.

Geography
Edison is located at  (48.562531, -122.436514).

According to the United States Census Bureau, the CDP has a total area of 0.6 square miles (1.5 km2), all of it land.

Demographics
As of the census of 2000, there were 133 people, 52 households, and 35 families residing in the CDP. The population density was 227.4 people per square mile (88.5/km2). There were 55 housing units at an average density of 94.0/sq mi (36.6/km2). The racial makeup of the CDP was 92.48% White, 3.76% Native American, 2.26% Asian, and 1.50% from two or more races. Hispanic or Latino of any race were 0.75% of the population.

There were 52 households, out of which 34.6% had children under the age of 18 living with them, 59.6% were married couples living together, 7.7% had a female householder with no husband present, and 30.8% were non-families. 21.2% of all households were made up of individuals, and 3.8% had someone living alone who was 65 years of age or older. The average household size was 2.56 and the average family size was 3.03.

In the CDP, the age distribution of the population shows 24.8% under the age of 18, 4.5% from 18 to 24, 23.3% from 25 to 44, 39.1% from 45 to 64, and 8.3% who were 65 years of age or older. The median age was 43 years. For every 100 females, there were 118.0 males. For every 100 females age 18 and over, there were 122.2 males.

The median income for a household in the CDP was $46,607, and the median income for a family was $50,982. Males had a median income of $40,000 versus $21,719 for females. The per capita income for the CDP was $18,547. None of the population or families were below the poverty line.

Notable people

 George Boomer (1862–1915) and Harry Ault (1883–1961), journalists and members of the Equality Colony
 Edward R. Murrow (1908–1965), news journalist, graduate of Edison High School

Schools

Edison High School was in use as Edison Elementary School until its replacement with a new, larger building in 1996. Currently, the only school located in Edison is (the new) Edison Elementary School, a K-8 school, built on the site of the former Edison High School.

See also

 Equality Colony
 Socialist Party of Washington

Footnotes

External links

 "Browse Issues: Industrial Freedom, Edison Washington," Chronicling America, Library of Congress, chroniclingamerica.loc.gov/

Census-designated places in Skagit County, Washington
Census-designated places in Washington (state)
1869 establishments in Washington Territory
Utopian communities in Washington